Carlton Midstrength (or Carlton Mid) is an Australian lager, brewed by Carlton & United Beverages, a subsidiary of the Foster's Group. The beer is currently one of the three mid-strength beers available, which is the second largest beer segment in Australia.

The alcohol content is 3.0%, and they are available in 375ml Bottles, 375ml Cans which are 0.9 standard drink and 750ml Bottle and they are 1.8 standard drink. Bittering hops and hop extracts are combined to give the hop-character like tastes in the drink.

See also

Australian beer
 List of breweries in Australia

References

External links
 Carlton Midstrength official site

Foster's Group
Australian beer brands
Asahi Breweries